Barra El Mezquital is a barrier island on the coast of the Mexican state of Tamaulipas, separating the Laguna Madre from the Gulf of Mexico.

References

Islands of Mexico
Barrier islands